Wilburton station may refer to:

Wilburton railway station, a train station in Cambridgeshire, England
Wilburton station (Sound Transit), a future light rail station in Bellevue, Washington

See also
 Wilburton (disambiguation)